The 1907 Aberdeen South by-election was held on 20 February 1907. The by-election was held due to the incumbent Liberal MP, James Bryce, being appointed British Ambassador to the United States. It was won by the Liberal candidate George Esslemont.

Fred Bramley, who stood for the "Aberdeen Labour Representation Committee", was not officially endorsed by the Labour Party or the Scottish Workers' Representation Committee.

Campaign
Esslemont, the Liberal candidate, supported extending the right to vote to women. Despite this, the Women's Social and Political Union set up a local campaign office to campaign against him. This put the WSPU in conflict with local women's suffrage campaigners who supported Esslemont.

References

1907 elections in the United Kingdom
1907 in Scotland
1900s elections in Scotland
20th century in Aberdeen
By-elections to the Parliament of the United Kingdom in Scottish constituencies
Elections in Aberdeen
February 1907 events